Palaeospiza bella ("beautiful ancient chaffinch") is a bird which was originally considered a passerine but is now included in the Coliiformes.
Palaeospiza bella lived in what is now Colorado in the Eocene and Oligocene.

References

Coliiformes
Paleogene birds of North America
Eocene birds
Oligocene birds